Glencoe is the county seat of McLeod County, Minnesota, United States. The population was 5,631 at the 2010 census.

Geography
U.S. Highway 212 and Minnesota State Highway 22 are the town's two main routes.

History
Glencoe was laid out in 1855, and named after Glen Coe, Scotland. A post office has been in operation at Glencoe since 1856. Glencoe was incorporated as a city in 1909.

Demographics

2010 census
As of the census of 2010, there were 5,631 people, 2,220 households, and 1,467 families living in the city. The racial makeup of the city was 92.0% White, 0.6% African American, 0.6% Native American, 0.8% Asian, 4.8% from other races, and 1.2% from two or more races. Hispanic or Latino of any race were 14.8% of the population.

There were 2,220 households, of which 33.9% had children under the age of 18 living with them, 52.3% were married couples living together, 9.3% had a female householder with no husband present, 4.4% had a male householder with no wife present, and 33.9% were non-families. 29.3% of all households were made up of individuals, and 14.2% had someone living alone who was 65 years of age or older. The average household size was 2.48 and the average family size was 3.06.

The median age in the city was 37.7 years. 26.2% of residents were under the age of 18; 7.7% were between the ages of 18 and 24; 26.5% were from 25 to 44; 22.5% were from 45 to 64; and 17.1% were 65 years of age or older. The gender makeup of the city was 48.5% male and 51.5% female.

2000 census
As of the census of 2000, there were 5,453 people, 2,103 households, and 1,446 families living in the city. The racial makeup of the city was 93.25% White, 0.17% African American, 0.28% Native American, 0.57% Asian, 0.13% Pacific Islander, 5.17% from other races, and 0.44% from two or more races. Hispanic or Latino of any race were 12.97% of the population.

There were 2,103 households, out of which 34.8% had children under the age of 18 living with them, 57.8% were married couples living together, 8.0% had a female householder with no husband present, and 31.2% were non-families. 27.3% of all households were made up of individuals, and 14.9% had someone living alone who was 65 years of age or older.  The average household size was 2.53 and the average family size was 3.10.

In the city, the population was spread out, with 27.9% under the age of 18, 7.0% from 18 to 24, 28.6% from 25 to 44, 19.1% from 45 to 64, and 17.3% who were 65 years of age or older.  The median age was 36 years. For every 100 females, there were 93.5 males.  For every 100 females age 18 and over, there were 87.8 males.

The median income for a household in the city was $46,723, and the median income for a family was $55,496. Males had a median income of $36,113 versus $25,230 for females. The per capita income for the city was $20,450.  About 0.8% of families and 2.1% of the population were below the poverty line, including 1.4% of those under age 18 and 3.0% of those age 65 or over.

Politics

Climate

Film
The town was the subject of the French film director Louis Malle's documentary God's Country, filmed in 1979 and 1985. Numerous townspeople were interviewed by Malle, including dairy farmer and banker Clayton Hoese and his sons.

See also
Glencoe Regional Health Services

References

External links

City of Glencoe
Glencoe - Silver Lake Schools
Louis Malle's Documentary about Glencoe

Cities in Minnesota
Cities in McLeod County, Minnesota
County seats in Minnesota